Dee Williams (May 1884 – December 23, 1911) was an American Negro league outfielder between 1909 and 1911.

A native of Topeka, Kansas, Williams played for the Buxton Wonders and the Kansas City Giants in 1909, and continued to play for Kansas City through 1911, playing for the Kansas City Royal Giants in 1910, returning to the Kansas City Giants for the 1911 season. He died in Kansas City, Kansas in 1911 at age 27.

References

External links
Baseball statistics and player information from Baseball-Reference Black Baseball Stats and Seamheads

1884 births
1911 deaths
Date of birth missing
Buxton Wonders players
20th-century African-American people
Kansas City Giants players
Kansas City Royal Giants players